Fevralskoye is a rural locality (a selo) in Rabochy Posyolok Fevralsk of Selemdzhinsky District, Amur Oblast, Russia. The population was 323 as of 2018. There are 10 streets.

Geography 
Fevralskoye is located 204 km southwest of Ekimchan (the district's administrative centre) by road. Fevralsk is the nearest rural locality.

References 

Rural localities in Selemdzhinsky District